Joseph Stock may refer to:

 Joseph Stock (bishop) (1740–1813), Irish Protestant churchman and writer, bishop of Killala and Achonry and afterwards bishop of Waterford and Lismore
 Joseph Stock (MP) (1789-1855), son of the above, Irish Whig politician
 Joseph Whiting Stock (1815–1855), American painter